The 1991 NCAA Division I Field Hockey Championship was the 11th women's collegiate field hockey tournament organized by the National Collegiate Athletic Association, to determine the top college field hockey team in the United States. The Old Dominion Lady Monarchs won their sixth championship, defeating the North Carolina Tar Heels in the final, a rematch of the previous two years' finals. The championship rounds were held at Villanova Stadium in Villanova, Pennsylvania on the campus of Villanova University.

Bracket

References 

1991
Field Hockey
1991 in women's field hockey
1991 in sports in Pennsylvania
Women's sports in Pennsylvania